Brief Nocturnes and Dreamless Sleep is the eleventh studio album by American progressive rock band Spock's Beard released on April 2, 2013. It is their first album with new singer Ted Leonard and drummer Jimmy Keegan in place of Nick D'Virgilio, while former member Neal Morse co-wrote two tracks, including "Waiting for Me", on which he plays guitar.

Background and recording
In the summer of 2011, Spock's Beard were scheduled to play at the Sweden Rock Festival and High Voltage Festival in Europe. Incumbent singer Nick D'Virgilio was unable to play at the dates, so the band recruited Enchant singer Ted Leonard to fill in for Nick on both shows. On 19 November 2011, Nick officially announced that he had left the band to pursue other projects, including playing for Cirque du Soleil. Later that week, the band announced that Leonard and touring drummer Jimmy Keegan had joined the band full-time as Nick's replacement.

On 13 May 2012, the band announced that work had begun on their 11th studio album, tentatively due in the fall of that year. On 1 December 2012, the title of the album was revealed as Brief Nocturnes and Dreamless Sleep and would be released in April 2013. As with previous albums, a preorder campaign was launched, this time on crowdfunding site Indiegogo, to fund the recording of the album. Contributors to the campaign were entitled to preorder a limited edition of the album that would include a bonus track not present on any other releases. The track listing was announced on the band's Facebook page on 18 January 2013.

Critical reception

The album has received positive reviews from music critics and has continued the return to progressive rock shown in its predecessors Spock's Beard and X. Classic Rock called the album, "the best album of their 20-year career to date."

Track listing

Sources:

Personnel

Spock's Beard
Ted Leonard — lead and backing vocals, guitar
Alan Morse — electric and acoustic guitars, backing vocals, pedal & lap steel guitar, mandolin, autoharp
Ryo Okumoto — organ, mellotron, piano, synths, clavinet, vocoder
Dave Meros — bass guitar, backing vocals
Jimmy Keegan — drums and percussion, timpani, backing vocals

Additional musicians
Stan Ausmus — song co-writer, additional guitar ("The Man You’re Afraid You Are")
John Boegehold — song co-writer, vocoder ("Something Very Strange")
Craig Eastman — violin, viola, hurdy-gurdy ("Waiting for Me", "Down a Burning Road")
Neal Morse — song co-writer, additional guitar ("Waiting for Me")

Production
Produced by Rich Mouser, Alan Morse and John Boegehold
Engineered, mixed and mastered by Rich Mouser at The Mouse House, Altadena, CA

Additional personnel
Thomas Ewerhard - graphic design
Alex Solca - photography
John Boegehold - Candid photos 
Stan Ausmus - Candid photos

Charts

References

2013 albums
Spock's Beard albums
Inside Out Music albums
Crowdfunded albums
Indiegogo projects